The Sigma SD9 is a digital single-lens reflex camera (DSLR) produced by the Sigma Corporation of Japan.  The camera was launched at the Photo Marketing Association Annual Show on February 18, 2002. It was Sigma's first digital camera, and was the first production camera to use the unique Foveon X3 image sensor, which reads full color at each pixel site.  Other sensors detect only one color at each site and interpolate to produce a full-color image.

The SD9 had two separate power systems; one set of CR-123A lithium batteries in the handgrip powered the camera functions, while another pair of CR-V3 batteries or four AA size rechargeable batteries in a battery tray in the base powered the digital functions.  This split power system showed that the camera functions (inherited from Sigma's SA-9 film SLR) were not integrated at all with the digital half.  

Another unusual feature of the SD9 was its "dust cover" filter right behind the lens mount, to prevent dust getting into the chamber and onto the sensor when changing lenses.

Reviewers and users reported good results in good lighting, but poorer ones in low light using either high ISO sensitivity or longer exposures.

The SD9 was succeeded by an updated model, the SD10, which addressed the power and low-light issues.

Software

Sigma Photo Pro 

Postprocessing of raw X3F and JPEG of all digital SIGMA cameras

Version 6.x  is free Download for Windows 7+ und Mac OS ab Version 10.7  (6.3.x).Actual Versions are 6.5.4 (Win 7+) and 6.5.5 (MacOSX 10.9+).

References

External links 

 Review at dpreview.com.
 Sigma USA page on the SD9.
 SD9 user image galleries
  SD 9 CNET specs
 SD 9 Manual PDF

SD09
Cameras introduced in 2002